Rog Autonomous Factory (Slovenian: Avtonomna tovarna Rog), known as Rog, was a squatted bicycle factory in Ljubljana. It was used as a cultural centre and self-managed social centre from 2006 until 2021. The complex housed a music venue, a skate park, a medical clinic for asylum seekers, a football pitch and artist ateliers. After years of debate over its future, the centre was evicted by the city council in January 2021.

History 
In 1871, Ivan Janeš bought the triangle of land in Ljubljana now bordered by the Trubarjeva, Petkovškovo and Rozmanova streets and set up a tannery. Karel Pollak purchased the land in 1900 and enclosed it, building a villa. The bicycle manufacturers Rog constructed the factory in 1951 and used it until 1991, when the site became derelict. It was recognised as a monument of national heritage in 1998 and bought by the city council in 2002, but remained empty apart from occasionally being used for events.

Occupation 

The factory complex was squatted in 2006 and kept the name Rog. The occupiers declared "As a non-formal network of individuals we believe that our actions are completely legitimate and well-grounded, although, at the moment, lacking official permission". The centre was run by assembly and hosted different activities, functioning as both a cultural centre for art and a self-managed social centre. It hosted concerts, lectures, refugee support activities and other events.

The centre was used by many groups, such as Antifašistična fronta (Antifascist Front), Nevidni delavci sveta (Invisible Workers of the World) and the Anarcho-Queer-Feminist collective. There was also a medical clinic for asylum seekers. Volunteers built the largest skate park in the Balkans in a previously  derelict hall. Another hall housed the concert venue and there were also the "Blue corner", a football pitch, a circus space, artist ateliers, galleries and a graffiti workshop.

Conflict with city council 

Mayor Zoran Janković threatened to evict the squat in 2010, but the support of the local community and organizations dissuaded him. In 2010, the city of Ljubljana participated in the Central European project A Second Chance: From Industrial Use to Creative Impulse, joining the cities of Nuremberg (former AEG factory), Leipzig (HALLE 14 of the former Cotton Spinning Mill), Venice (the Arsenale), and Kraków (a tram depot). The project aimed to upgrade former industrial sites into cultural hubs, and to make Rog into the Rog Centre for Contemporary Arts.

In 2016, the squat celebrated its ten year anniversary with concerts, exhibitions and debates. In June, the city council unsuccessfully attempted to evict the centre, bringing a digger to start demolishing in the middle of the night. It was later sued by the centre. A demolition permit had been signed in 2011 and extended in 2014, and was due to run out with no possibility to extend it again. The Rog collective then presented its own vision of how to develop the factory complex.

Eviction 
Rog was evicted in January 2021 by the city council, which claimed it was empty and abandoned at the time. The centre argued that the people ordered to leave the site following a court case had indeed left but other people were still using the space since in total there were between 100 and 200 participants, tolerated by verbal agreement with the council. The centre was given thirty days to appeal the judgement. Twelve people were arrested as they tried to stop city workers beginning the demolition of the site and eight were later charged with various offences. Afterwards a man was charged with burning down a tree at Prešeren Square.

The city of Ljubljana plans to set up a cultural centre in the foreseeable future in the former factory called the Rog Centre. An additional budget of 1.85 million euros has been funnelled towards the project, which aims to house 500 creative workers in 8000 m² of new development.

See also 
 Squatting in Slovenia
 Metelkova
 Temporary use

References

External links

Rog factory website
Rog – We are temporary, a documentary about the Rog factory

Further reading
 

</ref>

DIY culture
Former squats
Cultural venues in Ljubljana
Cultural centers
Center District, Ljubljana
Skateparks
Cycle manufacturers of Slovenia
2006 establishments in Slovenia
2021 disestablishments in Slovenia